Manjolai labourers massacre or Thamirabarani massacre of 23 July 1999 was the death of 17 Dalit labourers, including two women and a two-year-old child, when they got into the river to escape Tamil Nadu Police lathi-charge. Public were going in procession to Tirunelveli Collectorate to submit a memorandum demanding wage settlement for the tea plantation workers of Manjolai estate. An altercation between the police and the marchers resulted in a lathi charge by police. When the marchers ran helter-skelter, many fell into the river and died.Human Rights Watch condemned the brutal police attack and killing of Dalit tea plantation workers.

Background 
On 23 July 1999, a large number of labourers from the Tea estates of Manjolai congregated in Tirunelveli and marched towards the Collectorate demanding the release of a number of estate workers, who were arrested earlier for staging protest demanding better wages. The workers were being paid  70 per Day then and they were demanding the pay to be increased to  100. The workers were also demanding maternity leave, periodical breaks for women during the eight-hour-long duty. They were also opposing the decision of the estate owners to force workers to stay in sheds with poor facilities and deny right to rear cattle or even raise Gardens.
A large contingent of stone throwing and lathi-wielding police brutally assaulted the protesters forcing them to run towards the river. As police continued to chase them to the river, many got into the river and drowned. Justice Mohan Commission that probed into the incident submitted that 11 of the 17 died due to drowning, while rest died due to injuries.
Even now, much of their demands have not been met, but the estate workers have since been kept satisfied with a pay of  138 per Day.

Documentary film 
The theme of the incident is the basis for Death of a river (Oru Nathiyin Maranam) a Tamil language documentary film released in 1999. The 59-minute Tamil film is the work of the Kanchanai Film Society, produced and directed by R R Srinivasan.

See also 
Paramakudi riots
1957 Ramnad riots

References 

1990s in Tamil Nadu
Politics of Tamil Nadu
Riots and civil disorder in India
1999 riots
1999 in India
Crime in Tamil Nadu
Massacres in India
Deaths in India
Tirunelveli district
Tirunelveli
Violence against Dalits in Tamil Nadu
Police brutality in India